Bura Chapori Wildlife Sanctuary is a protected area located in the state of Assam in India. This wildlife sanctuary covers 44.06 km2, on the south bank 
of the Brahmaputra River in Sonitpur district. The area was declared a Reserved forest in 1974, it became a sanctuary in 1995. It is located 40 km from Tezpur town and  181 km away from Guwahati.It forms an integral part of the Laokhowa-Burachapori eco-system and is a notified buffer of the Kaziranga Tiger reserve.

Biodiversity
It is considered to be an ideal habitat for the Bengal florican. It is a paradise for many migratory birds. Reptiles and fish are also found here. Other attractions are:

 Mammals
Indian rhinoceros, tiger, leopard, wild buffalo, hog deer, wild pigs and occasionally a herd of elephants.

 Birds
Bengal florican, black-necked stork, mallard, openbill stork, teal, whistling duck and many others.

References

External links
Bura Chapori Wildlife Sanctuary at assaminfo.com.
Bura Chapori Wildlife Sanctuary at Tour Travel World.com
Burachapori Wildlife Sanctuary at assamforest.in.

Wildlife sanctuaries in Assam
Sonitpur district
Protected areas established in 1974
1974 establishments in Assam